Zabiele  is a village in the administrative district of Gmina Jaświły, within Mońki County, Podlaskie Voivodeship, in north-eastern Poland.

Notable people
Tadeusz Pikus (born 1949), Bishop of Warsaw

References

Villages in Mońki County